The 2014 Nashville Venom season was the first season as a professional indoor football franchise and their first in the Professional Indoor Football League (PIFL). The Venom were of eight teams competing in the PIFL for the 2014 season.

In November 2012, it was announced that the Venom would be the eighth and final team of the Professional Indoor Football League for the 2014 season. Unlike other teams in the American Conference of the new PIFL, the Venom were an entirely new team, not a continuation of a franchise in the former Southern Indoor Football. A few days after being introduced it was announced by Managing Partner Jeff Knight that Billy Back would be the first coach in Venom history. The Venom began their inaugural season on March 29, 2014, in Huntsville, Alabama against the Alabama Hammers. Their first home game was on April 5, against the Harrisburg Stampede. The Venom finished the regular season 10-2, the best record in the league, and won the American Conference regular season title. Their nine All-PIFL selected players were the most of any team. In the American Conference Championship Game, the Venom defeated the Columbus Lions 44-39 to advance to PIFL Cup III. On July 12, 2014, the Venom won their first PIFL Cup Championship, defeating the Lehigh Valley Steelhawks 64-43.

Schedule
Key:

Regular season
All start times are local to home team

Postseason

Roster

Division Standings

References

External links
2014 results

Nashville Venom
Nashville Venom
2014 in sports in Tennessee